Sigma Beta Delta is a scholastic honor society that recognizes academic achievement among students in the fields of business, management, and administration
.

History 
Sigma Beta Delta was founded by Beta Gamma Sigma on January 16, 1994, in La Jolla, California. Beta Gamma Sigma, itself an honor society for students enrolled in AACSB-accredited business schools, formed Sigma Beta Delta to recognize the achievements of students at regionally accredited universities that lacked AACSB accreditation. Since its formation, Sigma Beta Delta has been considered the "sister" honor society of Beta Gamma Sigma. The organizations have many shared goals, including the promotion and recognition of scholarship in business-related fields of study.

Initially a small, U.S.-based honor society, Sigma Beta Delta's three founding chapters were established at Belmont University, North Carolina State University, and Morehouse College. Sigma Beta Delta was admitted to the Association of College Honor Societies in 1994, shortly after it was founded.

As of January 16, 2016, Sigma Beta Delta has 277 active chapters across the United States, and a total membership of 68,658 undergraduate, graduate, and doctoral degree members.

Membership 
Eligibility for membership in Sigma Beta Delta applies to all students at a non-AACSB, regionally accredited school of business in the United States, who rank in the upper 20 percent of their undergraduate or graduate class. All students enrolled in a regionally accredited doctoral program in business are eligible to join the honor society upon graduation. Generally, undergraduate and graduate students must have completed at least half of their coursework in order to be considered for membership. An offer of membership, once accepted, is a lifetime distinction for high-achieving students of business programs.

Publications 
The national office of Sigma Beta Delta publishes the Aspirations newsletter each semester. This newsletter, distributed among members nationwide, reviews the honor society's achievements, fundraising goals, new chapters, and fellowship awards to students at chapters across the country. Available online, Aspirations is the key way for Sigma Beta Delta members to keep in touch with each other.

See also
 Alpha Kappa Psi , professional
 Delta Sigma Pi , professional
 Phi Gamma Nu , professional, originally women's
 Phi Chi Theta , professional, originally women's
 Epsilon Eta Phi , merged into 

 Beta Gamma Sigma , honor, (AACSB schools)
 Delta Mu Delta , honor, (ACBSP)
 Pi Omega Pi , honor, business education teachers

 Alpha Beta Gamma , honor, (2-yr schools)
 Kappa Beta Delta , honor, (2-yr schools, (ACBSP)

 Association of College Honor Societies

References

External links
 
  ACHS Sigma Beta Delta entry
 Sigma Beta Delta chapter list at ACHS

Association of College Honor Societies
Honor societies
1994 establishments in California
Student organizations established in 1994